Eliza Sharpe (1796–1874) was a British miniature painter who was one of four gifted sisters

Life
Sharpe was born in Birmingham to Sussanna and an engraver named William Sharpe and she was baptised on 21 August 1796 at St Phillip's church. The parents allowed Eliza, Louisa, Mary Ann and Charlotte to travel to the continent to inspect galleries in France and Germany. 

William taught each of the daughters to engrave. William and Sussanna moved the Sharpe family to London in 1817. Whilst she was a child she was painted with her sister Louisa by George Henry Harlow. She had nearly fifty miniature portrait paintings accepted at the Royal Academy starting in 1817.

Eliza's sister, Louise, married in 1834 and moved to Dresden. Eliza visited her there as  Anna Brownell Jameson wrote of Louise and Eliza Sharpe when she was in Germany that no man could paint like they did. This was not because the Sharpe sisters work was so clever but because it was so essentially feminine.

Like her sister Eliza became a member of the old Watercolour society where she exhibited over 80 paintings and rose to be their secretary. The most expensive pictures were biblical scenes but her other costume work sold well although at more modest prices. These prices and her success at having her work engraved for annuals allowed her to amass "a modest little fortune".

Eliza died unmarried at the house of her nephew in 1874 in London.

External links
 , a painting for Flowers of Loveliness, 1838, engraved by G. Adcock, with a poetical illustration by Letitia Elizabeth Landon.

References

1796 births
1874 deaths
Artists from Birmingham, West Midlands
Portrait painters
19th-century English painters
English watercolourists
Sibling artists